Hurricane Bonnie was a long-lived storm in the 1992 Atlantic hurricane season. It was the third tropical or subtropical storm and second hurricane of the 1992 season. Bonnie formed at high latitudes in the central Atlantic on September 17. Devoid of any real steering currents for much of its lifespan, it was nearly stationary for over a week in the central Atlantic Ocean. On September 27, it began to slowly track east and northeast towards the Azores. Just before becoming extratropical, it affected the Azores on September 30, although no damage was reported.

Meteorological history

The origins of the system was a cold front that moved off the U.S. East Coast on September 11. The front moved gradually off the coast and into the subtropical Atlantic Ocean before becoming stationary just east of Bermuda on September 15. Over the next two days, the cloud cover slowly detached itself from the front and form into a tropical low in its own right. On the afternoon of September 17, the system was organized enough to be declared Tropical Depression Four.

The depression organized steadily that evening and into the morning of September 18. Later that day, it was upgraded to Tropical Storm Bonnie and it began to move slowly to the northeast. Like most storms that develop in higher latitudes, Bonnie was embedded in a larger-scale cyclonic circulation at first, which minimized shear (allowing it to develop) and provided weak steering currents. The low shear allowed Bonnie to rapidly develop and a small but well-defined eye formed late that morning. The storm was upgraded to a hurricane later that day while meandering in the open ocean. The intensification rate slowed down after becoming a hurricane. In addition, Bonnie began to slowly move more to the northeast on September 19 as steering currents slowly developed. Bonnie strengthened into a Category 2 hurricane on the Saffir-Simpson hurricane scale that morning as well, peaking at 105 mph (165 km/h) with a 970 mbar central pressure. The general track and intensity maintained itself throughout the day and into September 20, when the eye became less distinct and Bonnie weakened slightly, although remaining a Category 2 hurricane. Early on September 21, the eye became better defined once again and Bonnie restrengthened slightly while continuing its slow northeast motion. That afternoon, the storm gradually strengthened some more and reached its peak intensity of 110 mph (175 km/h) and a central pressure of 965 mbar, just under Category 3 intensity. Bonnie maintained its strength through the evening and into the early morning of September 22, when it began to weaken very gradually and level off. Bonnie also began to turn more eastward at that point before it became held up by a blocking mid-latitude ridge of high pressure, which stalled the motion.

Bonnie remained virtually stationary until the morning of September 23 when it drifted very slowly to the west-southwest in response to the ridge. It also began to gradually weaken as the low-level center became exposed and the storm became poorly organized. Convection also diminished, and on the afternoon of September 24, Bonnie was downgraded to a tropical storm as it drifted over cooler waters. Bonnie continued to lose most of its deep convection during the day on September 25 as it began to make a turn back around to the south. That evening, Bonnie was downgraded to a tropical depression.

The weakening trend ended early on September 26 and Bonnie regained tropical storm status that afternoon as deep convection re-established itself. Bonnie continued its change in direction, turning to the southeast at this point as it slowly redeveloped despite being in a high-shear environment. It had also briefly showed signs of becoming extratropical on September 27 as it made the turn to the northeast as a weak tropical storm, and was operationally declared extratropical at that point until the afternoon of September 28. During that period, Bonnie actually strengthened back into a high-end tropical storm. Bonnie roughly followed Hurricane Charley's path towards the Azores thereafter. The storm became entrenched in an environment with greater wind shear, although it only weakened slightly on September 29 as it accelerated towards the northeast. The storm crossed over the Azores on September 30 as a strong tropical storm with 65 mph (100 km/h) winds. After that, Bonnie quickly lost its tropical characteristics and was declared extratropical late that afternoon, just east of the Azores. The extratropical low drifted back to the southwest in a clockwise loop, actually approaching the Azores once again while dissipating. It dissipated on October 2.

Impact
When Bonnie passed over the Azores only four days after Charley, it resulted in tropical storm-force winds across much of the island chain. Lajes Air Base reported sustained winds of 40 mph (64 km/h) with gusts to 59 mph (94 km/h). In addition, one man was killed by a rock fall on the island of São Miguel. No damage was reported in the Azores.

See also

 Other storms of the same name
 List of Azores hurricanes

References

External links
 NHC's Preliminary Report on Hurricane Bonnie

Bonnie (1992)
Bonnie (1992)
Bonnie